Side mount may refer to more than one topic.
Sidemount or side mount is a configuration of breathing gas cylinders carried by scuba divers, and a shortened form of Sidemount diving or Side mount diving
Side control also known as side mount is a wrestling technique